The Cryogenian (from , meaning "cold" and , romanized: , meaning "birth") is a geologic period that lasted from . It forms the second geologic period of the Neoproterozoic Era, preceded by the Tonian Period and followed by the Ediacaran.

Cryogenian was the time of drastic biosphere changes. After the previous Boring Billion years of stability, at the beginning of Cryogenian the severe Sturtian glaciation began, freezing the entire Earth in a planetary state known as a Snowball Earth. After 70 million years it ended, but was quickly followed by the Marinoan glaciation, which was also a global event. These events are the subject of much scientific controversy specifically over whether these glaciations covered the entire planet or a band of open sea survived near the equator (termed "slushball Earth").

Ratification
The Cryogenian Period was ratified in 1990 by the International Commission on Stratigraphy. In contrast to most other time periods, the beginning of the Cryogenian is not linked to a globally observable and documented event. Instead, the base of the period is defined by a fixed rock age, that was originally set at 850 million years, but changed in 2015 to 720 million years.

This could cause ambiguity because estimates of rock ages are variable and are subject to laboratory error. For instance, the time scale of the Cambrian Period is not reckoned by rock younger than a given age ( million years), but by the appearance of the worldwide Treptichnus pedum diagnostic trace fossil assemblages. This means that rocks can be recognized as Cambrian in the field, without extensive lab testing.

Currently, there is no consensus on what global event is a suitable candidate to mark the start of the Cryogenian Period, but a global glaciation would be a likely candidate.

Climate

The name of the geologic period refers to the very cold global climate of the Cryogenian.

Characteristic glacial deposits indicate that Earth suffered the most severe ice ages in its history during this period (Sturtian and Marinoan).  According to Eyles and Young, "Late Proterozoic glaciogenic deposits are known from all the continents.  They provide evidence of the most widespread and long-ranging glaciation on Earth."   Several glacial periods are evident, interspersed with periods of relatively warm climate, with glaciers reaching sea level in low paleolatitudes.

Glaciers extended and contracted in a series of rhythmic pulses, possibly reaching as far as the equator.

 
The Cryogenian is generally considered to be divisible into at least two major worldwide glaciations. The Sturtian glaciation persisted from 720 to 660 million years ago, and the Marinoan glaciation which ended approximately 635 Ma, at the end of the Cryogenian. The deposits of glacial tillite also occur in places that were at low latitudes during the Cryogenian, a phenomenon which led to the hypothesis of deeply frozen planetary oceans called "Snowball Earth".

Paleogeography 

Before the start of the Cryogenian, around 750 Ma, the cratons that made up the supercontinent Rodinia started to rift apart. The superocean Mirovia began to close while the superocean Panthalassa began to form. The cratons (possibly) later assembled into another supercontinent called Pannotia, in the Ediacaran.

Eyles and Young state, "Most Neoproterozoic glacial deposits accumulated as glacially influenced marine strata along rifted continental margins or interiors."  Worldwide deposition of dolomite might have reduced atmospheric carbon dioxide.  The break up along the margins of Laurentia at about 750 Ma occurs at about the same time as the deposition of the Rapitan Group in North America, contemporaneously with the Sturtian in Australia.  A similar period of rifting at about 650 Ma occurred with the deposition of the Ice Brook Formation in North America, contemporaneously with the Marinoan in Australia. The Sturtian and Marinoan are local divisions within the Adelaide Rift Complex.

Cryogenian biota and fossils 
Fossils of testate amoeba (or Arcellinida) first appear during the Cryogenian Period. During the Cryogenian Period, the oldest known fossils of sponges (and therefore animals) formed.
The issue of whether or not biology was impacted by this event has not been settled, for example Porter (2000) suggests that new groups of life evolved during this period, including the red algae and green algae, stramenopiles, ciliates, dinoflagellates, and testate amoeba.

The end of the period also saw the origin of heterotrophic plankton, which would feed on unicellular algae and prokaryotes, ending the bacterial dominance of the oceans.

See also

References

Further reading

External links 
 
  (2010s) BBC/CBC/NHK

 
02
Geological periods
Ice ages
Glaciology
Geology controversies
Proterozoic geochronology